The Russian thistle stem miner moth (Coleophora parthenica) is a moth of the family Coleophoridae. It is native to North Africa, the Middle East and Asia, including Pakistan, Egypt and Turkey. It is an introduced species in the United States in California, Nevada, Utah, Idaho, Arizona and Hawaii. It has been introduced intentionally as a biological control of invasive Salsola species.

Adults are creamy-white. There are up to three generations per year in warm areas and one or two generations in cooler areas.

The larvae feed on Salsola species, including Salsola australis. Young larvae hatch bore directly into the leaves and then into the branches and stems where they feed in the central pith and complete their development. Full-grown larvae cut an exit hole in the stem, leaving only a thin layer of epidermis to cover the exit hole. After cutting the exit hole, the larva retreats a short distance into its tunnel and pupates.

References

External links
Coleophora parthenica in North America
Bugguide.net. Species Coleophora parthenica - Russian Thistle Stem Miner Moth - Hodges#1398.8

parthenica
Moths of Africa
Moths of Asia
Moths described in 1891